Samyang ramen (Instant Noodles) is instant ramen made by Samyang Foods, a South Korean grocery company.

History 
It was launched as South Korea's first ramen product on September 15, 1963.

Industrial oil scandal 
On November 3, 1989, an anonymous letter was sent to the South Korean authorities alleging that Samyang ramen was made with industrial oil. This led to five food representatives, including one from Samyang Foods, being arrested under the Act on Special Measures for the Control of Health Offenses, and Food Sanitation Act.

On November 6, 1989, the Ministry of Health, Social Affairs, and Health ruled that ramen was safe for human consumption, and all detained representatives were released. However, the company's public reputation was left greatly damaged.

Trivia
The company claims their noodles are 50 m (164 ft) long.

See also
 Samyang Food
 Samyang's Hot Chicken Flavor Ramen

References

Products introduced in 1963
1963 in South Korea
Korean noodles
Instant noodle brands